Maja Svetik (born 9 March 1996) is a Slovenian handball player for RK Krim and the Slovenian national team.

She represented Slovenia at the 2019 World Women's Handball Championship.

References

External links

1996 births
Living people
Slovenian female handball players
People from Šempeter pri Gorici